Romas Kalanta (22 February 1953 – 14 May 1972) was a 19-year-old Lithuanian high school student known for his public self-immolation protesting Soviet regime in Lithuania. Kalanta's death provoked the largest post-war riots in Lithuania and inspired similar self-immolations. In 1972, 13 more people committed suicide by self-immolation. 

Kalanta became a symbol of the Lithuanian resistance throughout the 1970s and 1980s. In 2000, he was posthumously awarded the Order of the Cross of Vytis.

Life and death 
Kalanta was religious; in a school essay he indicated that he would like to become a Catholic priest, which caused him some troubles with the authorities. He attended an evening school while working at a factory. Kalanta played the guitar and made a few drawings; he had long hair and sympathised with the hippies. These sympathies were later exploited by the Soviets to discredit Kalanta among the older population. He had an older brother named Antanas.

At noon on 14 May 1972, Kalanta poured 3 litres of petroleum on himself and set himself on fire in the square adjoining the Laisvės Alėja in front of the Kaunas State Musical Theatre where, in 1940, the  puppet legislature People's Seimas had declared the establishment of the Lithuanian SSR and petitioned the Soviet Union to admit Lithuania as one of the soviet socialist republics. He died about 14 hours later in hospital. Before the suicide, Kalanta left his notebook with a brief note on a bench. Its content became known only after the declaration of independence in 1990 and opening up of secret KGB archives. The note read "blame only the regime for my death" (Lithuanian: Dėl mano mirties kaltinkite tik santvarką). No other notes were found to explain in more detail what had provoked the suicide. 

After his death, rumours spread that a few of his classmates had formed a patriot group, and that they had held a lottery to determine which of them would have to carry out the mission. Official Soviet propaganda claimed that Kalanta was mentally ill.

Riots and aftermath 

The Soviet government tried to cover up the event, but its witnesses spread the news by word of mouth. On 18 May, the Soviet authorities hastened Kalanta's burial by several hours to prevent publicity. His funeral procession touched off two full days of rebellion in which thousands of people took to the streets shouting: "Freedom for Lithuania!". They attacked a police station and the party offices. The people gathered, mostly high school students and young workers, broke into a politically charged riot, which was forcibly dispersed by the KGB, militsiya, and Internal Troops. The next day, about 3,000 people marched along the Laisvės Alėja of which 402 were arrested.  The New York Times reported numerous injuries and one death among Soviet troops. 

The public agitation was felt throughout 1972 and 1973 as the KGB registered various anti-Soviet incidents to even greater degrees. Lithuania recorded 13 other suicides by fire in 1972, including 24-year-old V. Stonys in Varėna on 29 May, 60-year-old A. Andriuškevičius in Kaunas on 3 June, 62-year-old Zališauskas on 10 June, and 40-year-old Juozapas Baracevičius in Šiauliai on 22 June.

See also 
 Pole Ryszard Siwiec's self-immolation in 1968
 Czechoslovak Jan Palach self-immolated in 1969
 Ukrainian Oleksa Hirnyk self-immolated in 1978
 Lithuanian Vytautas Vičiulis self-immolated in 1989

References

External links 
 Article based on memories of Kalanta's brother

1953 births
1972 deaths
Youth suicides
Lithuanian anti-communists
People from Alytus
Self-immolations in protest of the Eastern Bloc
Soviet dissidents
Suicides in Lithuania
Suicides in the Soviet Union
Recipients of the Order of the Cross of Vytis
Anti-Russification activists
1972 suicides